Duchess of Atholl is a title given to the wife of the Duke of Atholl. Women who have held the title include:

Charlotte Murray, Duchess of Atholl (1731-1805)
Anne Murray, Duchess of Atholl (1814-1897)
Katharine Stewart-Murray, Duchess of Atholl (1874-1960)

Other uses
RMS Duchess of Atholl, a Canadian Pacific ocean liner